James Thomas Wylie (26 October 1887 – 19 December 1956) was a New Zealand rugby union player, who represented both the country of his birth and Australia. He went on to coach the Stanford University rugby team for over 30 years from 1917.

He first represented  in 1910, playing six matches, before moving to Sydney for the next two years. There he made four appearances for New South Wales against Queensland, and in 1912 he was a member of the Australian team that toured North America. Because of injury he only made four appearances on that tour, and did not play in the international against the United States. Wylie returned to New Zealand in 1913, making a further six appearances for Auckland, and being selected as a member of the New Zealand national side, the All Blacks. He played an international against Australia in Wellington and then was a part of the tour of North America. He played in 11 matches on that tour, including the test against the United States, in which he scored a try.

Wylie remained in the United States after the tour, and studied engineering at Stanford University, where he turned out for the university rugby team. In 1917, he became the Stanford rugby head coach, and continued in that role until at least 1948.

References

1887 births
1956 deaths
Rugby union players from the Bay of Plenty Region
University of Auckland alumni
New Zealand rugby union players
New Zealand international rugby union players
Auckland rugby union players
New South Wales Waratahs players
Rugby union flankers
New Zealand emigrants to the United States
Stanford University alumni
American rugby union coaches
American rugby union players